Giridih is headquarters of the Giridih district of Jharkhand state, India. The city of Giridih is known for its industrial and health sectors, as well as its scenic beauty. Giridih houses the Giridih Coalfield which is one of the oldest coalfields to be worked in India. Giridih is one of the six Data Processing Centres of Data Processing Division (DPD) of National Sample Survey Office (NSSO). Before 1972, Giridih was part of Hazaribagh district.

Etymology
The literal meaning of Giridih is the land of hills and hillocks – giri, a Hindi word, means hills and  dih, another word of the local Khortha dialect, means land of.

History
Giridih district was a part of Kharagdiha estate until the late 18th century. During the British Raj Giridih became a part of Jungle Terry. After Kol Uprising in 1831, the parganas of Ramgarh, Kharagdiha, Kendi and Kunda became parts of the South-West Frontier Agency before being renamed to Hazaribag, which became the administrative headquarters. The Kharagdiha Rajas were settled as Rajas of Raj Dhanwar in 1809, and the Kharagdiha gadis were separately settled as zamindari estates. Some of the notable Kharagdiha Zamindari Estates were Koderma, Gadi Palganj, Ledo Gadi, Gande Gadi, Ghoranji Gadi and Gadi Sirsia. The town of Giridih was under the rule of the Khargdiha Zamindari Estate of Salimpur and the temporarily settled estate of Karharbari. 
 
Giridih district was created on 6 December 1972 by carving some parts of Hazaribagh district. In 1999 part of it became Bokaro district. It is currently a part of the Red Corridor.

Minerals
Land of Giridih is rich in coal, and once Giridih was boomed by mica industry which exported mainly to Japan and the USSR. There are many small and big mines of coal found in Giridih, particularly in the southern side.

Geography

Location
It is a conical granite peak located 4,477 feet (1,365 metres) above the sea level.

Note: The map alongside presents some of the notable locations in the district. All places marked in the map are linked in the larger full screen map.

Climate
The climate of Giridih is generally dry. It is pleasant during the winter season between October and March. Summer season starting April, is generally hot, with May being hottest when the temperature rises up to 47C. Often high temperature is accompanied by high humidity levels, especially during June when premonsoon rainfalls. It rains maximum during July and August, and rainy season continues up to mid-October.

Government and politics
Nageshwar Prasad Sinha was the first MP from Giridih when the town declared as a separate district from Hazaribagh.
Ravindra Kumar Pandey from the Bharatiya Janata Party won the 2014 Indian general election from Giridih (Lok Sabha constituency) and Chandra Prakash Choudhary is the present Member of Parliament. Giridih city forms the Giridih (Vidhan Sabha constituency).Sudivya Kumar from Jharkhand Mukti Morcha is the current MLA from Giridih legislative seat.

Transport
Giridih is connected by Road and Rail link.

Rail

Giridih railway station (GRD) is connected to Madhupur Junction (MDP) located 38  km to the east by a single broad gauge railway line. There is a single passenger train which runs five times a day between the two stations and takes about an hour to reach Giridih.  is under the administration of the Asansol division of the Eastern Railway zone of Indian Railways.

New Giridih railway station (NGRH) lies to the north of Giridih city in Gadi. It became operational after the railway line between Koderma Junction (KQR) and Maheshmunda (MMD) was completed, and is under the administration of the Dhanbad division of the Eastern Central Railway zone. Presently train is ferrying once between Koderma and Maheshmunda and once between Koderma and Madhupur via New Giridih.

Parasnath railway station (PNME), on the Howrah-Delhi grand chord line, is 48 km from Giridih towards south-west in Isri and is under the administration of the Dhanbad division of the Eastern Central Railway zone.

There are other proposals as well to connect  with  via Tundi and Govindpur, and with  via Bengabad, Chakai and Sono.

Road
The NH 19 (old NH 2)/Grand Trunk Road passes through Giridih district but away from the city.

Giridih has a bus terminus in the centre of the town. The bus stand is divided into platforms for private buses. A government bus terminus is just adjacent to the main bus terminus.  There are regular bus services from the city to other parts in the district. Bus service to Ranchi, Dhanbad, Bokaro, Hazaribagh, Deoghar, Jamshedpur, Durgapur, Kolkata, Howrah, Asansol, and Patna is available.

Air
Boro Aerodrome is an airstrip at the district headquarters of Giridih. Giridih is well connected to some of the popular airports of Bihar, Jharkhand and West Bengal and they are :
Deoghar Airport, Deoghar 
Kazi Nazrul Islam Airport, Durgapur 
Birsa Munda Airport, Ranchi  
Gaya Airport 
Lok Nayak Jayaprakash Airport, Patna 
Netaji Subhas Chandra Bose International Airport, Kolkata

Demographics

Population

 India census, Giridih Urban Agglomeration had a population of 143,529, it is the seventh largest city of Jharkhand. Males constitute 53% of the population and females 47%. Giridih has an average literacy rate of 69%, higher than the national average of 59.5%; male literacy is 74%, and female literacy is 63%. In Giridih, 15% of the population is under 6 years of age. The language spoken is known as Khortha.

Giridih Urban Agglomeration is composed of Giridih (Nagar Parishad), Paratdih (CT), Sirsia (CT), Pertodih (CT) and Dandidih (CT).

Religion 

Hinduism is the prominent religion of Giridih city followed by 67.66% of the population. Islam is the dominant minority religion in the city followed by 30.31% of the people. Other minorities are Christians 0.84%, Sikhs 0.55%, Jains 0.47%, Buddhists 0.04%, and others 0.07%.

Infrastructure
According to the District Census Handbook 2011, Giridih, Giridih covered an area of 9.75 km2. Among the civic amenities, it had 41 km roads with both open and closed drains, the protected water supply involved tapwater from treated sources, uncovered well, overhead tank. It had 17,381 domestic electric connections, 1,410 road light points. Among the medical facilities, it had 4 hospitals (allopathic and others), 53 dispensaries, 53 health centres, 1 family welfare centre, 5 maternity and child welfare centres, 7 maternity homes, 1 TB hospital/ clinic, 16 nursing homes, 3 chairtable hospital/ nursing homes, 2 veterinary hospitals, 25 medicine shops. Among the educational facilities it had 28 primary schools, 15 middle schools, 7 secondary schools, 8 senior secondary schools, 3 general degree colleges. It had 2 recognised shorthand, type-writing and vocational training centre,1 non-formal education centre (Sarva Siksha Abhiyan), 1 special school for disabled. Among the social, cultural and recreational facilities, it had 1 working women's hostel, 1 stadium, 4 cinema theatres, 1 auditorium/ community hall, 1 public library and reading room. Three important commodities it produced were lac, coal, mica. It had the branch offices of 14 nationalised banks, 7 private commercial banks, 2 cooperative banks, 1 agricultural credit society, 1 non-agricultural credit society.

Economy

It has a growing economy. This town used to bustle with economic activity in the period from the 1960s to 1980s when the mineral mica processing and export community reaped tremendous gains through exports to the USSR. However, since the decline of the USSR and its split into twelve CIS countries, the industry has slowly declined and is currently ailing.

On the southern side of Giridih, in Beniadih, are the coal mines of Central Coalfields Limited, a subsidiary of Coal India Limited (a Maharatna and the world's largest coal miner). It is the largest industry in the Giridih district and major contributor to the economy of the town. Central Coalfields Limited itself is a Miniratna.

The Data Processing Center of Data Processing Division (DPD) of National Sample Survey Office (NSSO) provides complete IT solution from sample selection, software development to processing and tabulation of data canvassed through various socio-economic surveys of National Sample Survey Organisation.

Mica business also contribute a lot in the trade data, mainly mica is exported to China, Europe, Japan, Taiwan, US the total value of mica exports is  100 million, the leading mica exporters are Jalan Mica Exports, Ratan Mica Exports, Jai Mica, Mount Hill, Chandauri Mica Syndicate Etc.

In 2006 the Indian government named Giridh one of the country's 250 most backward districts (out of a total of 640). It is one of the 21 districts in Jharkhand currently receiving funds from the Backward Regions Grant Fund Programme (BRGF).

Presently, there are more than a dozen Sponge Iron and Rolling Mill Factories in Giridih. The name of few are Mongia Steel, SriBir, Siscon, Baba, Salasar, SriRam, Lal Steel, Saluja Gold, Gouri Shanker etc.

There is an Industrial Area adjacent to the city, which is full of small, medium and large Factories, these units provide employment to the locals and also to people from different parts of the country. These are namely Mongia Steel, Saluja Steel & Power, and Shivam Group of Companies.

However, pollution remains a critical issue in the surroundings of the Industrial Area which needs to be addressed by Municipal Corporation of Giridih, Chamber of Industries & Commerce and other authorities.

Culture

Kheer Kadam, Kalakand, Rajbhog (rasgullah), Tilkut, Ghewar and Piau are popular sweet here.

Shivratri, Durga Puja, Chhath, Deepawali, Holi, Guru Purnima, Ram Navami, Eid ul-Fitr, Eid-ul-Adha, Moharram, Vishwakarma Puja, Saraswati Puja, Raksha bandhan, Karma, Parshvanath Mahotsav popularly Known as International Nonviolence Festival organised by Parshva/nath International University Trust, Giridih( CharitableTrust) every Year at Madhuban,Parsanath Mahavir Jayanti, Shyam Mahotsav, Sarhool, and Christmas are among the long list of festivals celebrated in Giridih. After Chhath puja, a local village fair is held at Pachamba known as Gaushala (cow shed) fair.

Education
 

Notable colleges include:
 Khandoli Institute of Technology affiliated to AICTE
 Giridih College affiliated to the Vinoba Bhave University
 Langta Baba College affiliated to the Vinoba Bhave University
 Sri Ram Krishna Mahila College affiliated to Vinoba Bhave University.
 Vananchal College affiliated to Vinoba Bhave University.

Notable schools include:
 Carmel School, Giridih
 Birla School, Giridih
 BNS DAV Public School, Giridih
 Candy Floss S Goenka School, Giridih
 DAV Public School (CCL), Beniadih, Giridih
 Delhi Public School, Giridih
 Dineshwar Verma Intermediate College, Remba, Giridih
 Holy Cross, Giridih
 Honey Holy Trinity School, Giridih
 Jawahar Navodaya Vidyalaya, Gandey, Giridih
 Kiran Public School, Giridih
 Naman International School Remba
 Rani Laxmi Bai Middle school, Giridih
 Saraswati Shishu Vidya Mandir, Barganda, Giridih
 Shri Guru Nanak Vidhyalaya, Giridih
 Sigmon Mission School, Giridih
 Sir JC Bose Girls High school, Giridih
 St. Joseph School, Giridih
 Subhash Public School, Koldiha, Giridih

Tourism 

 Shri Sammed Shikharji, also known as the Parasnath Hills, with the highest mountain peak in Jharkhand, 4480 feet above sea level, is a major Jain pilgrimage destination and one of the most sacred places for Jains in the world. According to Jain belief, twenty of the twenty-four Tirthankaras (teachers of the Jains), (including Parshanath) attained Moksha (Nirvana) from this place.
Rajdah Dham, Sabalpur, उत्तरवाहिनी गंगा (प्रकृति की अनुपम भेंट ) also known as Rajdaha, is a temple of Lord Shiva. It is situated approximately 60 km Giridih and 5 km from Suriya. (Near Nimatand Sabalpur). It is situated on the bank of the Barakar River.
 Langta Baba Samadhi Sthal This is located in Kharagdiha, about 30 km North West of the town on road towards Jamua.  Langta Baba is revered both by the Hindus and the Muslims alike. People offer chadar to his samadhi as a ritual, and it is believed the wish made here by a true devotee always get fulfilled.
 Usri Falls 13 km from town, on the Tundi road, it is a picnic spot. The Usri river falls a 40 feet steep gorge in three separate streams. The place is surrounded by dense forest of Parasnath Hills.
 Khandoli Dam located 7 km North-East of Giridih headquarters towards Bengabad block, is a scenic water reservoir and a dam. The place has been developed as a tourism attraction. It has water-related adventure sports and bird-watching. A number of other amusement facilities are available there including boating, Rock-climbing, Parasailing and Kayaking.
 Sri Kabir Gyan Mandir in Sihodih, some 2 km from Giridih headquarters, Founded in 1985, a motivational institution is headed by Sadguru Maa Gyan which spreads the message of Sant Kabir and Sanatan Dharma. It has a sacred temple Guru Govind Dham with an idol of Sant Kabir and Lord Vishnu. It also has Kabir Gyan Darshan with worth to watch murals and paintings based on life of Sant Kabir, Vedas, Morality and paintings of saints of India.
Surya Mandir is located in Mirzaganj, 33 km from Giridih Town. It is built in the middle of a lake in the shape of a Lotus flower. Pilgrims can visit here while returning from Langta Baba Samadhi. The temple has been declared Monument of National importance and is maintained by Archaeological Survey of India.

Notable people

 Anurag Anand – Born in Giridih | Director & Producer who has produced various documentaries and tale shows for international giants like BBC, Channel 4, National Geographic & Discovery. He also owns a production house known as Inkingenious Media which is headquartered in London. 
 Sir Jagadish Chandra Bose spent his last days in Giridih and the Sir J.C. Bose Girl's High School is named in his honour.  He died in Giridih. His then residence is now known as "Vigyan Kendra" run by "Bihar Council of Science and Technology".
 Jnan Chandra Ghosh, studied at Giridih High School, where he passed the Entrance Examination of Calcutta University. He played an important role in shaping science and engineering education in India. He was the first Director of Indian Institute of Technology Kharagpur, Director of Indian Institute of Science, Bangalore, and Vice-Chancellor of Calcutta University.
 Satyajit Ray, film maker and Oscar recipient, spent his childhood in Giridih. He sketched his fictional character (appearing in a series of science fiction books), scientist Professor Shonku as residing in Giridih beside the Usri river.
Krishna Ballabh Sahay was the elected member of Bihar Legislative Assembly from Giridih Constituency for several terms, including the one in which he served as the chief minister of Undivided Bihar during 1963 – 67.
 Rabindranath Tagore, literary figure and Nobel Laureate, also spent some time in Giridih. He wrote his Shivaji Utsav in 1904 while residing in Giridih. The house in which he resided, Dawasika Bhawan, still exists in Giridih.

References

 Vigyan Kendro

External links
 Official website of the Giridih district
 

 
Giridih district
Community development blocks in Jharkhand
Community development blocks in Giridih district
Cities and towns in Anga Desh
Cities and towns in Giridih district